Rieutort-de-Randon is a former commune in the Lozère department in southern France. On 1 January 2019, it was merged into the new commune Monts-de-Randon.

Geography
The lac de Charpal forms part of the commune's eastern border; from the lake, the Colagne flows northwestward through the northern part of the commune.

See also
Communes of the Lozère department

References

Rieutortderandon